Joann Judith Rosario (born June 3, 1974) is an American gospel/CCM singer, and a pastor.

Rosario was born in Chicago to parents of Puerto Rican background. Her father is a pastor and she sang in his church as a child. Under her fathers ministry, she recorded several live Spanish language worship albums and is known for introducing the gospel vocal sound to the Spanish Christian market. Her professional career began in 1997 as a background singer for Marvin Sapp, then left in 1999 to be a member of Fred Hammond's Radical for Christ. Hammond helped her launch a solo career in 2001 with her Spring 2002 debut album More, More, More. In 2003, Rosario was diagnosed with nodules on her vocal folds, and took an extended hiatus to treat the condition. She released a follow-up effort in 2005 and a third in 2007.

As a licensed Christian minister Joann travels internationally, preaching and singing in English and Spanish. She is now pastoring in Douglasville GA, RainFire Church Maranatha which was launched in March 2014. Joann's latest book is Father, Here I Am and is a 40-day devotional for women.

Discography
More More More (Verity/Zomba, 2002) U.S. Gospel #11
Now More Than Ever (Verity/Zomba, 2005) U.S. Gospel #4
Joyous Salvation (Zomba, 2007) U.S. Gospel #13

References

American gospel singers
People from Atlanta
American performers of Christian music
Singers from Chicago
American people of Puerto Rican descent
Hispanic and Latino American women singers
Living people
21st-century American singers
1974 births
People from Chicago
21st-century American women singers